The following is a timeline of the presidency of Donald Trump during the third quarter of 2019, from July 1 to September 30, 2019. To navigate quarters, see timeline of the Donald Trump presidency.

Overview

Public opinion

Timeline

July 2019

August 2019

September 2019

See also
 Presidential transition of Donald Trump
 First 100 days of Donald Trump's presidency
 List of executive actions by Donald Trump
 List of presidential trips made by Donald Trump (international trips)

References

2019 Q3
Presidency of Donald Trump
July 2019 events in the United States
August 2019 events in the United States
September 2019 events in the United States
2019 timelines
Political timelines of the 2010s by year
Articles containing video clips